Fraternitas Vanenica is Latvian all-male student fraternity (corporation) which was founded in Munich, Germany on June 20, 1947. It is the youngest Latvian student fraternity.

Overview 

Fraternitas Vanenica is a Latvian all-male, lifelong fraternity. It has two mottos: Veritati, humanitati, virtuti and Tēvijai, Pienākumam, Draudzībai (For fatherland, duty, and friendship). Its colours are green, red and silver.
Its name, translated from Latin, means Brotherhood of Vanema. Vanema was an ancient land in Latvia (Kurzeme) in the late Iron Age.

History

Early years 

Fraternitas Vanenica was founded by 18 Latvian students (mostly from Latvian University) who in years of war and after it arrived in Germany as refugees.
Fleeing from the second soviet occupation, more than 150 000 Latvians emigrated from Latvia in the years 1941-1945. Most of them spent some time in Germany. Thus many young people wanted to restore their studies in German universities.

Fraternitas Vanenica was partly established on the base of Latvian student society in Munchen. Fraternity admitted Latvian students mostly from Munich universities.
These years was very active. Despite financial problems and poverty in post-war Germany, Fraternitas Vanenica was able to admit new members and to educate them in the spirit of pre-war Latvian student fraternities.

USA period  

In the 1950, most Latvian refugees started moving to United States, Canada and other western countries. Also members of Fraternitas Vanenica moved to USA and on June 21, fraternity restored its work in USA, with headquarters in New York City. Also many members later moved to Venezuela and established there autonomous group of the fraternity.
In those years, the  fraternity admitted Latvian students from American and Venezuelan universities and colleges.

Almost all Latvian student fraternities which renewed their work in exile, experienced the same problems. But despite threats of assimilation and lack of funds, student fraternities was one of the symbols of once independent Latvia. They helped to maintain Latvian language and culture in Latvian exile society and also retained more than 100-year-old traditions of Latvian student fraternities.

Fraternitas Vanenica today 

In 1991, with collapse of Soviet Union, Latvia regained its independence. Many Latvian student fraternities restored their work in Latvia as early as 1989.
Fraternitas Vanenica was exile organization so it moved to Latvia in 1992 and fully started work on September 24. Soon global centre (presidium) was also moved to Riga. It is registered with University of Latvia, but members ar admitted from all Latvian universities.
In 2002 Fraternitas Vanenica bought its own house in Riga, Artilērijas street 54.
Today members of Fraternitas Vanenica is mostly economists, financiers, auditors and historians.

Student organisations in Latvia
1947 establishments in Germany
Student organizations established in 1947